The Duchy of Rawa was a feudal district duchy in Masovia, centered on the Rawa Land. Its capital was Rawa. It existed during the High Middle Ages era, from 1313 to 1370, and from 1381 to 1442.

The state was established in April 1313, in the partition of the Duchy of Płock, with duke Siemowit II of Masovia becoming its first leader. It existed until 5 November 1370, when, under the rule of duke Siemowit III, duchies of Czersk, Rawa, and Warsaw were unified into the Duchy of Masovia. It was again reestablished in June 1381, in the partition of the Duchy of Masovia, with duke Siemowit IV as its first leader. It existed until 1488, when it got incorporated into the Duchy of Czersk.

From 1310 to 1320, it was a fiefdom within the Kingdom of Poland, and from 1320 to 1385, a fiefdom of the United Kingdom of Poland, and from 1386 to 1442, a fiefdom of the Crown of the Kingdom of Poland.

List of rulers

First state 
 Siemowit II of Masovia (1313-1345)
 Siemowit III and Casimir I of Warsaw (1341–1349)
 Siemowit III (1349–1370)

Second state 
 Siemowit IV (1381–1426)
 Trojden II of Płock, Casimir II of Belz, Władysław I of Płock, and Siemowit V of Masovia (1426–1427)
 Casimir II of Belz, Władysław I of Płock, and Siemowit V of Masovia (1427–1434)
 Siemowit V of Masovia (1434–1442)

Citations

Notes

References

Bibliography 
Janusz Grabowski, Dynastia Piastów Mazowieckich.
Anna Suprunik, Mazowsze Siemowitów.
J. Krzyżaniakowa, J. Ochmański, Władysław II Jagiełło.
O. Balzer, Genealogia Piastów. Kraków. 1895.

Former countries in Europe
Former monarchies of Europe
Duchies of Poland
Fiefdoms of Poland
Duchy of Rawa
Duchy of Rawa
14th-century establishments in Poland
14th-century disestablishments in Poland
15th-century disestablishments in Poland
States and territories established in 1313
States and territories disestablished in 1370
States and territories established in 1381
States and territories disestablished in 1442